Brent Amaker and the Rodeo is an American Country and Western band from Seattle, Washington consisting of Brent Amaker, Johnny Nails, Jordan Gomes, Ben Strehle, and Bryan Crawford.

Overview
Brent Amaker and the Rodeo formed in Seattle, Washington, in 2005. The band's image recalls influential country musician Johnny Cash, 'The Man in Black', as they dress head-to-toe in black with matching Stetson hats and cowboy boots. They are billed as influenced by art rock performers Devo and glam rock's David Bowie.

Much emphasis is put into the band's image as evidenced by a large collection of photos and music videos done by the band, fans, and photographers and videographers. The Rodeo have a cinematic quality and are often put in context of Spaghetti Western films made by Sergio Leone and Ennio Morricone.

Their concerts often feature a dancing girl from local burlesque troupes and a phenomenon only known as the "Whiskey Baptism" where Amaker welcomes new fans into the "Church of the Rodeo" by pouring shots of liquor into their mouths.

Recently, they have been gaining notoriety from their cover of "Pocket Calculator" by German electro-pioneers Kraftwerk.

They also performed in the indie slasher film "Punch" directed by Jay Cynik. Cynik also wrote a comic book based on the exploits of the band on tour called "Mescal de la Muerte." Illustrated by Portland, Oregon artist, Simon Young, the graphic adult novel was included in their 2010 release "Please Stand By."

Personnel 
Brent Amaker-Vocals/Guitar
Ryan Leyva (AKA Johnny Nails) - Lead Guitar
 Jordan Gomes - Bass
Ben Strehle-Rhythm Guitar, back-up vocals
Bryan Crawford-Drums, back-up vocals

Former Members
Tiny Dancer
Lance Mercer
Cinderella
Mason Lowe
Curtis Andreen
Tim Harmon
Louis O'Callaghan
Graig Markel
Sugar McGuinn
Aaron Mlasko

Discography 
Brent Amaker and the Rodeo - 2006
Howdy Do (Gravewax Records) - 2008
Please Stand By (Spark & Shine) - 2010
Year of the Dragon (Fin Records) - 2013
Android Amaker - 2014

Compilations 
Californication 2009 Soundtrack

Singles 
When Love Gets to a Man
Man In Charge featuring Tilson from The Saturday Knights (Remix) (Spark & Shine)
Pocket Calculator (Kraftwerk cover) (Spark & Shine)
Captain of the Ship(Spark & Shine)
Johnny's Theme PSmoov Remix (Spark & Shine)

Film/TV/Other Appearances  
Brent Amaker and the Rodeo's song "Doomed" was featured on the season 7 finale of the Showtime series Weeds.
Brent Amaker and the Rodeo's song "You Call Me the Devil" was featured on the Showtime series Californication on Season 2 Episode 6 "Coke Dick & the First Kick"
Brent Amaker and the Rodeo appeared in Jay Cynik's indie slasher film "Punch" and contributed music to the film's soundtrack
Brent Amaker and the Rodeo's song "Man In Charge" was featured in Episode 2 of HBO's mini-series Big Little Lies featuring Nicole Kidman and Reese Witherspoon.
Brent Amaker and the Rodeo's song "Country Sky" was featured in Episode 6 of HBO's mini-series Sharp Objects featuring Amy Adams.

References

External links 
 Brent Amaker and the Rodeo Myspace Page
 Terrorbird Media
 the mixtape chats with Brent Amaker & The Rodeo

American country music groups
Musical groups from Seattle